Marialite (Japanese マリアライト, foaled 19 February 2011) is a Japanese Thoroughbred racehorse and broodmare. She was slow to mature and did not race until she was three years old when she won two minor races. She finally emerged as a top class performer in 2015 when she won the Grade 1 Queen Elizabeth II Cup. In the following year she recorded her biggest victory when she defeated male opposition to take the Takarazuka Kinen and received the JRA Award for Best Older Filly or Mare.

Background
Marialite is a brown mare bred in Japan by Northern Farm. During her racing career she was trained by Takashi Kubota and raced in the green, white and red colours of the Northern Farm affiliate U Carrot Farm. She was ridden in most of her races by Masayoshi Ebina.

She is from the fourth crop of foals sired by Deep Impact, who was the Japanese Horse of the Year in 2005 and 2006, winning races including the Tokyo Yushun, Tenno Sho, Arima Kinen and Japan Cup. Deep Impact's other progeny include Gentildonna, Harp Star, Kizuna, A Shin Hikari and Makahiki. Marialite's dam Chrysoprase showed some racing ability, winning three times from 23 starts in Japan between 2004 and 2007, and has also produced the Grade 2 winner Lia Fail and the Japan Dirt Derby winners Chrysolite and Chrysoberyl. She was a granddaughter of the Irish Oaks winner Regal Exception.

Racing career

2014: three-year-old season
Marialite made her racecourse debut on 11 January 2014 in a contest for previously unraced three-year-olds over 2000 metres at Nakayama Racecourse and won from Remove Again and fourteen others. She then finished third in a minor race at the same track in March and sixth in the Listed Sweetpea Stakes at Tokyo Racecourse in May. On 29 June at Tokyo she won a minor event over 1800 metres and then finished third over the same distance at Niigata Racecourse in August. After the summer break she returned for two races at Tokyo, finishing third over 1800 metres in October and fifth over 2000 metres in November.

2015: four-year-old season

Marialite began her 2015 campaign by finishing third in a minor race at Tokyo in February and was then moved up in distance to win a race over 2500 metres at Nakayama in March. In May she won again, taking the ungraded Ryokufu Stakes over 2400 metres at Tokyo. She was then stepped up into Grade 3 class for the Mermaid Stakes at Hanshin Racecourse on 14 June in which she started the 2.5/1 favourite and finished second of the sixteen runners, beaten three quarters of a lengths Chateau Blanche.

After a three and a half month summer break, the filly returned in the Grade 2 Sankei Sho All Comers at Nakayama on 27 September and finished fifth of the fifteen runners behind Shonan Pandora. On 15 November at Kyoto Racecourse the filly ran for the first time in Grade 1 class when she started a 14.2/1 outsider for the Queen Elizabeth II Cup. The Yushun Himba winner Nuovo Record started favourite, while the best-fancied of the other runners were the previous year's winner Lachesis and the three-year-old Rouge Buck (also owned by U Carrot Farm). After racing in mid-divion in the early stages, Marialite, racing in a blue hood, was switched to the outside by Ebina entering the straight and produced a strong run to take the lead 200 metres from the finish. She held off the late run of Nuovo Record to win by a neck, with Touching Speed a nose away in third place. Takashi Kubota who was winning his first Grade 1 after twelve years of training said "I’m so delighted with her achievement because I’ve been training her towards this goal all along and she’s built up into a great filly. I left all the tactics to Ebina and she ran such a smooth race, I was really excited watching her charging down the homestretch. She held on so well!"

On her final run of the year, Marialite was one sixteen horses invited to contest the Arima Kinen over 2500 metres 27 December at Nakayama. She trailed the field in the early stages but then produced a strong finish to take fourth place behind Gold Actor, Sounds of Earth and Kitasan Black. The unplaced horses included Lovely Day and Gold Ship.

2016: five-year-old season
On 26 March Marialite began her third season in the Grade 2 Nikkei Sho at Nakayama and finished third behind Gold Actor and Sounds of Earth. In the Meguro Kinen Handicap at Tokyo two months later she started the 2/1 favourite but was beaten a neck by the four-year-old colt Cryptogram, to whom she was conceding four pounds in weight. On 26 June at Hanshin, Marialite started a 24.1/1 outsider in a seventeen-runner field for the Grade 1 Takarazuka Kinen over 2200 metres. Duramente started favourite ahead of Kitasan Black and Lovely Day, while the other runners included Satono Crown, Toho Jackal (Kikuka Sho), One And Only (Tokyo Yushun) and Ambitious (Osaka Hai). Drawn on the outside of the field, the mare raced in mid-division, before beginning to make rapid progress in the straight. She overhauled the front-running Kitasan Black in the final strides and held off the late challenge of Duramente to win by a neck. Kitaan Black was a nose away in third ahead of Lovely Day. She became only the third female to win the race after Sweep Tosho in 2005 and Eight Crown in 1966. Masayoshi Ebina commented "She was in her best form of her spring campaign. Also, the somewhat soft going and the draw all worked well for her. She ran a perfect race. I think that the patience of the connection to wait for her to mature has led to this success".

In her autumn campaign, Marialite contested the same three raced that she had in the previous year. After finishing fifth to Gold Actor in the All Comers on 25 September she attempted to repeat her 2016 success in the Queen Elizabeth II Cup. She started favourite but came home sixth of the fifteen runners behind Queens Ring. In her last race on 25 December she finished tenth of the sixteen runners in the Arima Kinen, six and three quarter lengths behind the winner Satono Diamond.

Assessment and awards
In the JRA Awards for 2015 Marialite finished third behind Shonan Pandora and Straight Girl in the voting for the JRA Award for Best Older Filly or Mare. She took the award in the following year when she took 233 of the 291 votes.

Pedigree

References

2011 racehorse births
Racehorses bred in Japan
Racehorses trained in Japan
Thoroughbred family 16-a